The Creepers series is a sequence of young-adult horror novels written by Australian horror writer Rob Hood, with Australian YA and children's writer Bill Condon. From 1996 to 1997, Hood (in collaboration with Bill Condon) published the nine-volume series, a line of fantastic children's horror novels (Hodder Headline): Ghoul Man, Freak Out!, Loco-Zombies, Slime Zone, Bone Screamers, Rat Heads (this one written entirely by Hood), Brain Sucker (this one written entirely by Condon), Humungoid, and Feeding Frenzy. The books have also been published in Italy and Ireland.

There is a different series also called Creepers, written by Edgar J. Hyde; titles include Blood on Tap, Beggar Boy, The Piano, The Scarecrow, Ghost Writer, The Wishing Well, The Ghostly Soldier, Doctor Death, Edgar Escapes, Soul Harvest, Mirror Mirror and Happy Halloween.

Horror novel series
Australian young adult novels
Young adult novel series